Limnocythere porphyretica is a species of crustacean in family Limnocytheridae. It is endemic to Australia.

Sources

External links

Limnocytheridae
Freshwater crustaceans of Australia
Vulnerable fauna of Australia
Taxonomy articles created by Polbot
Crustaceans described in 1981